
Gmina Jasło is a rural gmina (administrative district) in Jasło County, Subcarpathian Voivodeship, in south-eastern Poland. Its seat is the town of Jasło, although the town is not part of the territory of the gmina.

Villages
Gmina Jasło contains the villages and settlements of Bierówka, Brzyście, Chrząstówka, Gorajowice, Jareniówka, Kowalowy, Łaski, Niegłowice, Niepla, Opacie, Osobnica, Sobniów, Szebnie, Trzcinica, Warzyce, Wolica, Zimna Woda and Żółków.

Neighbouring gminas
Gmina Jasło is bordered by the gminas of Brzyska, Dębowiec, Frysztak, Jedlicze, Kołaczyce, Lipinki, Skołyszyn, Tarnowiec and Wojaszówka.

References
Polish official population figures 2006

Jaslo
Jasło County